Amy Spanger (born May 21, 1971) is an American actress, singer and dancer.

Early life 
Spanger was born in Newbury, Massachusetts.

Career 
Spanger made her Broadway debut in 1995 in the musical Sunset Boulevard, following a half-year run in the pre-Broadway national tour of Jekyll & Hyde. She originated the role of Lois Lane (Bianca) in the Broadway revival of Kiss Me, Kate. In Chicago she played Roxie Hart, and in Urinetown, Hope Cladwell. In 2006, she originated the role of Holly in The Wedding Singer.

Spanger also appeared in the national touring companies of Rent and Chicago. She originated the role of Susan in the off-Broadway production of the Jonathan Larson musical tick, tick... BOOM!. Other stage credits include: Lunch, and Feeling Electric, which later became Next to Normal, in which she co-starred with actor Anthony Rapp.

She originated the role of Sherrie in the Broadway musical Rock of Ages but took an extended leave from the production in early June 2009, for vocal rest, before permanently departing the production on June 29 for "personal reasons". She more recently originated the role of Jovie in the stage musical adaptation of Will Ferrell's Christmas comedy Elf, that ran on Broadway for nine weeks at the Al Hirschfeld Theatre and closed on January 2, 2011. On September 8, 2015, Spanger joined the Broadway cast of Matilda the Musical as Mrs. Wormwood.

Spanger's television credits include: Ed, Becker, Egg: The Arts Show, Six Feet Under, Law & Order: Special Victims Unit, Michael & Michael Have Issues, and Bored to Death.  She also starred in the Showtime original movie musical Reefer Madness (2005), as the promiscuous Sally. She also appeared in Synecdoche, New York (2008), written and directed by Charlie Kaufman.

Personal life 

May 1, 2002, actor Michael C. Hall and Spanger married; he played Billy Flynn opposite her Roxie Hart in the Broadway musical Chicago, the summer after their wedding. The couple separated in 2005 and filed for divorce in 2006.

Filmography

Film

Television

References

External links 

1971 births
Living people
Actresses from Massachusetts
People from Newbury, Massachusetts
Singers from Massachusetts
Yale University alumni
21st-century American singers
21st-century American women
American musical theatre actresses